A Network Unaffiliated Virtual Operator (NUVO)  is similar to a Mobile virtual network operator  (MVNO)  however it has one key difference — a NUVO is not affiliated with a specific carrier. 
NUVO's use real telephone numbers, and through these they combine with all other commercial operators, allowing NUVO users to communicate with anyone — not just other people who use a mobile App, for example.

By assigning telephone numbers to their users, NUVO's can transmit text messages and voice call to anyone who has a telephone number.

This allows an app user to communicate with anyone simply by dialing their phone number, rather than limiting their communications to just other app users, as most over the top content  (OTT) apps do.

See also 
 MVNO
 Over the top content
 Mobile app 
 Voice call 
 Telephone number 
 Onoff telecom
 Thumbtel

References

Telecommunications